Glempang is a village in the town of Mandiraja Banjarnegara Regency, Central Java Province, Indonesia. This villages has an area of 569,91 hectares and a population of 4.965 inhabitants in 2010.

References

External link
 Banjarnegara Regency Official Website
 BPS Kabupaten Banjarnegara

Banjarnegara Regency
Villages in Central Java